The Central District of Ardal County is in Chaharmahal and Bakhtiari province, Iran. At the 2006 census, its population was 51,960 in 11,163 households. The following census in 2011 counted 37,187 people in 8,978 households. At the latest census in 2016, the district had 35,179 inhabitants living in 9,434 households.

References 

Ardal County

Districts of Chaharmahal and Bakhtiari Province

Populated places in Chaharmahal and Bakhtiari Province

Populated places in Ardal County